Tupá is a village and municipality in the Levice District in the Nitra Region of Slovakia.

History
In historical records the village was first mentioned in 1332.

Geography
The village lies at an altitude of 130 metres and covers an area of 11.97 km². It has a population of about 620 people.

Ethnicity
The village is about 65% Slovak and 35% Magyar.

Facilities
The village has a public library and football pitch.

External links
http://www.statistics.sk/mosmis/eng/run.html

Villages and municipalities in Levice District